Ayane (/aˈjaˌnɛ/) is the romanization of a feminine Japanese given name. Literally translated it means "colorful sound" (彩音 or 綺音).

 or Junko Hirata, Japanese singer-songwriter
, Japanese television personality
, Japanese badminton player.
, Japanese model and actress
, Japanese figure skater
, Japanese manga artist
, Japanese singer-songwriter
, Japanese actress
, Japanese voice actress and narrator

Fictional characters 
Ayane, in the Dead or Alive video games
Ayane, the titular character in Ayane's High Kick anime
Ayane, the antagonist in Nagasarete Airantou
Ayane Yagi, a character in the film Battle Royale II: Requiem

See also
Malika Ayane (born 1984), Italian singer
Ayan (given name), an unrelated name

Japanese feminine given names